Eric Akoto (born 20 July 1980) is a naturalized Togolese former professional footballer who played as a centre-back. Born in Ghana, he represented the Togo national team at international level.

Club career 
Akoto was born in Accra, Ghana. He started his career in Ghana, at Liberty Professionals FC in 1998 before moving to Austria later that year to play for Grazer AK. In 2002, he moved to FK Austria Wien, before moving to Germany in 2004 to play for FC Rot-Weiß Erfurt. On 1 June 2005, he returned to Austria to play for VfB Admira Wacker Mödling. In 2006, he once again moved to Grazer AK. In July 2007 he moved to Slovenia signing for Interblock Ljubljana.

In the January 2008 transfer window, Akoto went on trial with Football League Championship club Blackpool in England. He moved in July 2008 from Slovenian PrvaLiga Telekom Slovenije club, Interblock Ljubljana to Austrian Bundesliga club Kapfenberger SV. In 2009, he moved to Maccabi Ahi Nazareth and later to OFI Crete.

In July 2010, he signed with Australian A-League club North Queensland Fury FC where he played as a central defender. In the Fury's round 3 match versus Melbourne Victory, Akoto was red carded after an incident involving Kevin Muscat, where the Victory defender would not let Akoto pick up his mouthguard and resulted in Akoto pushing Muscat to the ground. Despite the incident being regarded as controversial by many media commentators, North Queensland opted against contesting the mandatory one-week suspension.

In December 2011, he signed for Floriana FC.

International career 
Born in the Ghanaian capital of Accra Akoto played for neighbouring Togo. He was part of the Togo national team's squad in the 2006 World Cup finals where Togo were knocked out of the competition in the group stages. He was on the bus carrying the Togo team which was attacked by gunfire on 8 January 2010.

References

External links 
 
 
 

1980 births
Living people
Footballers from Accra
Association football central defenders
Naturalized citizens of Togo
Togolese people of Ghanaian descent
Togolese footballers
Togo international footballers
2002 African Cup of Nations players
2006 Africa Cup of Nations players
2006 FIFA World Cup players
2010 Africa Cup of Nations players
Slovenian PrvaLiga players
Austrian Football Bundesliga players
A-League Men players
2. Bundesliga players
Maltese Premier League players
Liberty Professionals F.C. players
Grazer AK players
FK Austria Wien players
FC Admira Wacker Mödling players
FC Rot-Weiß Erfurt players
NK IB 1975 Ljubljana players
Kapfenberger SV players
Maccabi Ahi Nazareth F.C. players
OFI Crete F.C. players
Northern Fury FC players
Togolese expatriate footballers
Togolese expatriate sportspeople in Ghana
Togolese expatriate sportspeople in Austria
Expatriate footballers in Austria
Togolese expatriate sportspeople in Germany
Expatriate footballers in Germany
Togolese expatriate sportspeople in Slovenia
Expatriate footballers in Slovenia
Togolese expatriate sportspeople in Israel
Expatriate footballers in Israel
Togolese expatriate sportspeople in Australia
Expatriate soccer players in Australia
Togolese expatriate sportspeople in Greece
Expatriate footballers in Greece
Togolese expatriate sportspeople in Malta
Expatriate footballers in Malta
21st-century Togolese people